Aquanoids is a 2003 horror film directed by Reinhart "Ray" Peschke and starring Laura Nativo, Rhoda Jordan, Edwin Craig, and Ike Gingrich.

Plot
In 1987, 17 people were killed by humanoid creatures called Aquanoids.  These sea creatures seem to appear randomly and in 2003 return to Babylon Bay.  The heroine of the story, Vanessa, sees the creatures and warns the town of the imminent danger.  Vanessa's mother was one of the individuals killed in the first wave of attacks sixteen years ago.  But the town's mayor, in an effort to acquire a major land deal for a new mall, tries to disguise the attacks as boating accidents.

Since it is July 4, many people are visiting the beach to enjoy the festivities.  Vanessa desperately tries to ward off another mass killing by handing out fliers and even going on TV.  She travels around on a popular motorized vehicle, the powered scooter.  When the mayor's daughter is killed by an Aquanoid, he covers up the incident and executes the medical examiner.  He even has to abort the Aquanoid baby she is carrying. The film ends with the Aquanoids being killed.

Cast
 Laura Nativo as Vanessa DuMont
 Rhoda Jordan as Christina
 Laurence Hobbs as Jackson
 Edwin Craig as Frank Walsh
 Ike Gingrich as Clint Jefferson
 Suzan Spann as Courtney McClure
 Robert Kimmel as Stanze
 Christopher Irwin as Bruce

Reception
Jon Condit of Dread Central rated the film 1.5/5 stars and wrote, "In the end, Aquanoids only has two things going for it. The first is the obvious enthusiasm of the cast. The second is a gorgeous young starlet in skimpy outfits. Neither one makes it worth going out your way to see, although the second one does come pretty close."

References

External links
 
 

2003 films
2003 horror films
American natural horror films
2000s English-language films
2000s American films